Biospeedotrema is a genus of trematodes in the family Opecoelidae.

Species
Biospeedotrema biospeedoi Bray, Waeschenbach, Dyal, Littlewood & Morand, 2014
Biospeedotrema jolliveti Bray, Waeschenbach, Dyal, Littlewood & Morand, 2014
Biospeedotrema parajolliveti Bray, Waeschenbach, Dyal, Littlewood & Morand, 2014

References

Opecoelidae
Trematode genera